The following page lists some power stations in Norway. Norway produces a total of 13,570 MW for power consumption. For traction current, see Electric power supply system of railways in Norway.

Hydroelectric

Other Sources

See also 

Electricity sector in Norway
Energy in Norway
List of power stations in Europe
 List of largest power stations in the world

References 

Norway
 
Power stations